The  is a constituency that represents Ishikawa Prefecture in the House of Councillors in the Diet of Japan. It has two Councillors in the 242-member house.

Outline
The constituency represents the entire population of Ishikawa Prefecture. The district elects two Councillors to six-year terms, one at alternating elections held every three years. The district has 939,531 registered voters as of September 2015. The Councillors currently representing Ishikawa are:
 Naoki Okada (Liberal Democratic Party (LDP), second term; term ends in 2016)
 Syuji Yamada (LDP, first term; term ends in 2019)

Elected Councillors

Election results

See also
List of districts of the House of Councillors of Japan

References 

Districts of the House of Councillors (Japan)